Dridu is a commune located in Ialomița County, Muntenia, Romania. It is composed of two villages, Dridu and Dridu-Snagov. It also included Moldoveni village until 2005, when it was split off to form Moldoveni Commune.

Dridu is situated at the west side of Ialomița County, on the right side of the river witch gave the name of the county at the confluence of Prahova and Ialomița rivers. Is 80 km away from Slobozia (county capital) 18 km from Urziceni, and 50 km from the national capital Bucharest. It has a surface of  71 km2 and 3428 inhabitants as of 2011.

The origin of the name lost in the mist of history, some documents shows "Dridih" as origin (Radu cel Mare's manuscript) others "Dridova" (Vladislav The Third's manuscript).

The first documented naming of the village dates from 28 October 1464, when Radu cel Frumos donated the lands to the Snagov Monastery. In the second part of the 18th century a small wooden church was built, with very interesting sculpted pillars and no fresco. Some of the original parts are in a new wooden church built after a dig was built and the waters rose above the church level. After the Romanian Revolution of 1989, a new monastery was built over the remaining of Dridu culture (Quaternary relict ware found there).

References

Communes in Ialomița County
Localities in Muntenia